Pop & Oak is a songwriting and production duo consisting of Andrew "Pop" Wansel and Warren "Oak" Felder. Wansel is the son of Dexter Wansel, staff songwriter, producer and session musician of Gamble and Huff's Philadelphia International Records.

Life and careers
Pop and Oak began producing music together after their shared manager at the time suggested they work together. Oak described the day he met Pop was a red letter day and their partnership exposed him to hip-hop for the first time.  Their first production of visibility was Ashley Tisdale's "Hair" from her 2009 album, Guilty Pleasure.

Production style
The pair use a hands on style while working with artists, hoping to avoid a reputation of only being "beat-makers." Pop's style is more focused on rap with beats and bass, while Oak has a more "melodic" background in musical composition, pop and R&B.

Production discography

References

External links
 
 

American hip hop record producers
American songwriting teams
Record production duos